Excess Baggage may refer to:

Checked baggage that exceeds a carrier's maximum permitted weight or volume and for which an additional charge is payable

Films
Excess Baggage (1928 film), American lost silent comedy
Excess Baggage (1933 film), British comedy
Excess Baggage (1997 film), American crime comedy Alicia Silverstone and Benicio del Toro

Radio and television
Excess Baggage (radio programme), 2010–12 British travel series on BBC Radio 4
Excess Baggage (Australian TV series), 2012 Australian reality show